Angelo Turconi (5 July 1923 – 3 August 2011) was an Italian footballer who played as a midfielder. He competed in the men's tournament at the 1948 Summer Olympics.

References

External links
 

1923 births
2011 deaths
Italian footballers
Italy international footballers
Olympic footballers of Italy
Footballers at the 1948 Summer Olympics
Footballers from Lombardy
Association football midfielders
Aurora Pro Patria 1919 players
S.S.D. Varese Calcio players
Como 1907 players
Palermo F.C. players
S.S.D. Sanremese Calcio players
Serie A players
Serie B players
Serie C players